The Bigger Issues was a half-hour comedy drama series about an over-ambitious and incompetent fringe theatre company for BBC Radio 4 and was written and performed by Dave Lamb (as Keith Daniels), Jim North (as Francis), Nick Walker (as Dan), and Richie Webb (as each episode's guest musician). It ran for three series from 2000 to 2003. It was produced by Gareth Edwards.

There were three series, though only Series 1 has ever been repeated on BBC Radio 4e (or its previous incarnation, BBC Radio 7).

Episodes:
Series 1 (2000)
1.1 - Homelessness
1.2 - Disability (AKA Discrimination)
1.3 - Bigotry
1.4 - Homophobia

Series 2 (2002)
2.1 - Singing the Changes
2.2 - Monster Truck Drag Racing With Dickie Donald
2.3 - Hospital Radio With Terry Funny
2.4 - Ivan Donahoe's Thursday Essay

Series 3 (2003)
3.1 - The Crows
3.2 - Keith of Daventry
3.3 - Body Chemistry
3.4 - Escape

References
Radiolistings.co.uk

BBC Radio 4 programmes